Robert Pomakov (born February 25, 1981) is a Canadian operatic bass.

Born in Toronto, Ontario, Pomakov graduated from St. Michael's Choir School, Toronto, in 1999. In the summer of 1999 he attended the summer conservatory program at the Music Academy of the West. He later studied at the Curtis Institute of Music. He performed at the inaugural Luminato festival in Toronto.

Pomakov's first appeared in 2013 at the Metropolitan Opera in New York as Monterone in Verdi's Rigoletto.

Recordings
 Handel: Apollo e Dafne / The Alchemist, Naxos Records
 European Union Baroque Orchestra under Roy Goodman

References

External links
IMG Artists biography
Article in Scena.org
Biography, Naxos

1981 births
21st-century Canadian male opera singers
Living people
Musicians from Toronto
Operalia, The World Opera Competition prize-winners
Operatic basses
Curtis Institute of Music alumni
Music Academy of the West alumni